The Colfax County Courthouse is a historic four-story building in Schuyler, Nebraska, and the courthouse for Colfax County, Nebraska. When it was built by R. O. Stake in 1921–1922, it replaced the 1871-72 courthouse. The new courthouse designed in the Renaissance Revival style by German-born architect George A. Berlinghof. The cornerstone was laid in a Masonic ritual. The building has been listed on the National Register of Historic Places since September 3, 1981.

References

	
National Register of Historic Places in Colfax County, Nebraska
Government buildings completed in 1921
Renaissance Revival architecture in Nebraska
1921 establishments in Nebraska